All the Way is the twenty-eighth studio album recorded by American R&B singer Etta James. Two years after she released Blues to the Bone, James went to the recording studio in 2005 with a set of songs that share little association with her career.

Track listing 

 "All the Way" (Sammy Cahn, Jimmy Van Heusen) – 3:37
 "Stop On By" (Thomas Truman, Bobby Womack) – 4:08
 "Strung Out" (Johnny Watson) – 7:12
 "Somewhere" (Leonard Bernstein, Stephen Sondheim) – 2:15
 "Holding Back the Years" (Michael James Hucknall, Neil Moss) – 4:18
 "Imagine" (John Lennon) – 3:39
 "I Believe I Can Fly" (R. Kelly) – 5:10
 "It's a Man's Man's Man's World" (James Brown, Betty Newsome) – 4:53
 "Purple Rain" (Prince) – 5:45
 "What's Going On" (Renaldo Benson, Al Cleveland, Marvin Gaye) – 4:27
 "Calling You" (Robert E. Telson) – 6:14

References

Etta James albums
2006 albums
RCA Records albums